Banda Paramasivam is a 2003 Indian Tamil language comedy film directed by T. P. Gajendran and produced by P. T. Selvakumar. The film stars Prabhu, Kalabhavan Mani, and Abbas, Rambha, Abhinayasree, and Monica while Manivannan, Vinu Chakravarthy, P. Vasu, and Livingston, among others, play supporting roles. The music was composed by Sirpy, and editing was done by Ganesh Kumar. The film was released on 14 April 2003. It is a remake of the Malayalam film Mattupetti Machan (1998) This was Rambha's final Tamil film as a heroine.

Plot
Pandiyan (Manivannan) and Cheran (Vinu Chakravarthy) are stepbrothers who are constantly at loggerheads, and their daughters Manju (Ramba) and Anju (Abhinayasree) continue their enmity. They are always trying to prove to each other that one is better than the other and are always bickering. When Cheran sees his daughter's suitor Ravi (Livingston), who comes to see her in hopes of finding a future bride, Cheran insults Ravi for not having as much money as he did and questioned his mother if she had other husbands. Hearing this, Ravi's father suffers a heart attack. In anger, Ravi, wanting to make Cheran lose his properties and come to the streets, arranges to have a petty thief named Paramu (Prabhu) pose as a rich man and wriggle his way in as Pandiyan's son-in-law. Paramu and his friend Sivam (Kalabhavan Mani), who is also a thief, are always competing against each other to be better than the other and to become a millionaire before the other. This leads to a lot of comic rivalries, but Paramu mistakenly enters Pandiyan's house because the gate of Cheran's house had been recently been painted over. Manju begins falls for Paramu. Meanwhile, Sivam enters Cheran's house, posing as a cinema director. Madhavan (Abbas) helps them both since he is in love with a poor girl and is pretty sure that his father Chidambara Udayar (P. Vasu) will oppose his wedding. Paramu and Sivam make a deal with Madhavan that if he helps them become rich, then Paramu would adopt Shenbagam (Monica), the poor girl that Madhavan loves, so that they would be equal in prestige and stature. This way, Udayar would agree to their marriage. Paramu and Sivam pose as Udayar's sons. Things went worse when Paramu's father-in-law Pandiyan takes them to Madhavan's house.

The film revolves around how Paramu, Sivam, and Madavan deal with the situation and how everything comes to be known to both families and Madhavan's family forms the crux of the story.

Cast

Prabhu as Paramu
Kalabhavan Mani as Sivam
Abbas as Madhavan
Rambha as Manju
Abhinayasree as Anju
Monica as Shenbagam
Vinu Chakravarthy as Cheran
Manivannan as Pandiyan
P. Vasu as Chidambara Udayar, Madhavan’s father
Manobala as Police inspector
Livingston as Ravi
T. P. Gajendran as Vellaichamy
Charle as Nokia
Madhan Bob as Doctor
Rajkrishna as Film hero
T. K. Natarajan as Ravi’s father
Benjamin as Painter
Adhavan as Guna, Shenbagam’s brother
C. R. Saraswathi as Sornam, Pandiyan’s wife
Babitha as Pushpa, Cheran’s wife
Jaya Murali as Madhavan’s mother
Vijaya Singh as Ravi's mother
Neetu as Viji
Priyanka as Film heroine
P. T. Selvakumar as Shop owner
Lekhasri in a special appearance

Soundtrack
Soundtrack was composed by Sirpy and lyrics were written by Ra. Ravishankar.
"Panchumala" - Ranjith, Sujatha
"Tajmahal" - P. Unnikrishnan, Sujatha
"Mappillai" - Mano, Krishnaraj
"Lelakkadi" - Krishnaraj, Anuradha Sriram
"Aleka Aleka" - Mano, Krishnaraj

References

2003 films
Tamil remakes of Malayalam films
2000s Tamil-language films
Films directed by T. P. Gajendran